Tithe Act is a stock short title used in the United Kingdom for legislation relating to tithes.

List
The Tithe Act 1536 (28 Hen 8 c 11)
The Tithe Act 1540 (32 Hen 8 c 7)
The Tithe Annuities Apportionment Act 1921 (11 & 12 Geo 5 c 20)

The Tithe Acts 1836 to 1891 is the collective title of the following Acts:
The Tithe Act 1836 (6 & 7 Will 4 c 71)
The Tithe Act 1837 (7 Will 4 & 1 Vict c 69)
The Tithe Act 1838 (1 & 2 Vict c 64)
The Tithe Act 1839 (2 & 3 Vict c 62)
The Tithe Act 1840 (3 & 4 Vict c 15)
The Tithe Act 1842 (5 & 6 Vict c 54)
The Tithe Act 1846 (9 & 10 Vict c 73)
The Tithe Act 1847 (10 & 11 Vict c 104)
The Tithe Act 1860 (23 & 24 Vict c 93)
The Inclosure, &c. Expenses Act 1868 (31 & 32 Vict c 89)
The Tithe Act 1878 (41 & 42 Vict c 42)
The Tithe Rentcharge Redemption Act 1885 (48 & 49 Vict c 32)
The Extraordinary Tithe Redemption Act 1886 (49 & 50 Vict c 54)
The Tithe Act 1891 (54 & 55 Vict c 8)

The Tithe Acts 1836 to 1918 was the collective title of the Tithe Act 1918 (8 & 9 Geo 5 c 54) and Tithe Acts 1836 to 1891.

The Tithe Acts 1836 to 1925 was the collective title of the Tithe Act 1925 (15 & 16 Geo 5 c 87) and the Tithe Acts 1836 to 1918.

The Tithe Acts 1836 to 1936 is the collective title of the Tithe Act 1936 (26 Geo 5 & 1 Edw 8 c 43) and the Tithe Acts 1836 to 1925.

The Tithe Acts 1836 to 1951 is the collective title of the Tithe Act 1951 (14 & 15 Geo 6 c 62) and the Tithe Acts 1836 to 1936.

The Tithe Acts 1936 and 1951 is the collective title of the Tithe Act 1936 and the Tithe Act 1951.

See also
List of short titles

References

Lists of legislation by short title and collective title